Punalur is a town in Kerala, India.

Punalur may also refer to:
 Punalur railway station, a railway station in Kerala
 Punalur Suspension Bridge, a suspension bridge in Kerala
 Punalur Paper Mills, a paper mill in Kerala
 Punalur (Assembly constituency)